Yoke Island, known also as Islotes Los Provincianos is an island lying west of the north end of Liège Island in the Palmer Archipelago. Charted by the French Antarctic Expedition under Charcot, 1903–05. The name given by the United Kingdom Antarctic Place-Names Committee (UK-APC) in 1960 is descriptive of the shape of the island in both plan and elevation.

See also 
 Composite Antarctic Gazetteer
 List of Antarctic and sub-Antarctic islands
 List of Antarctic islands south of 60° S
 SCAR
 Territorial claims in Antarctica

References

External links 

Islands of the Palmer Archipelago